Stachys the Apostle (Greek: Στάχυς "ear-spike"; died 54) was the second bishop of Byzantium, from AD 38 to AD 54. He seemed to be closely connected to Andrew and Paul. Eusebius quotes Origen as saying that Andrew had preached in Asia Minor and in Scythia, along the Black Sea as far as the Volga and Kiev, hence he became a patron saint of Romania and Russia. According to tradition, Saint Andrew founded the See of Byzantium in 38, installing Stachys as bishop (the only bishopric in that neighbourhood before that time had been established at Heraclea). This See would later develop into the Patriarchate of Constantinople, having Apostle Andrew as its Patron Saint.

His feast day is on October 31.

Notes

External links 
 
 antiebeati.it
 

1st-century Romans
Seventy disciples
Saints from Roman Anatolia
Saints from Constantinople
1st-century Byzantine bishops
1st-century Christian saints
Bishops of Byzantium